Aistė Diržiūtė (born 18 October 1991) is a Lithuanian actress best known for her role as Austė in The Summer of Sangaile (Lithuanian: Sangailė or Sangailės Vasara).

Biography

Early life and career beginnings
Diržiūtė was born in Vilkaviškis.

From 1998 to 2005, Diržiūtė studied piano at a Vilkaviškis music school. In 2010 she moved to Vilnius where she studied music at the Vilnius college of higher education for a year and then entered the Lithuanian Academy of Music and Theatre. During her studies, Diržiūtė appeared in several commercials and got small roles in TV series.

2015-2016: Breakthrough

In 2015 Diržiūtė made her film debut. She co-starred in Robert Mullan's movie based on real events, We Will Sing, and was cast as one of the lead roles in Alantė Kavaitė's The Summer of Sangaile.

After The Summer of Sangaile premiered at the Berlin International Film Festival, Diržiūtė was noticed by film critics and became the first Lithuanian actress named as one of the European Shooting Stars, alongside actors such as Maisie Williams and Moe Dunford. Diržiūtė also won the award for Best Lithuanian Actress at the Vilnius International Film Festival and was nominated for both Sidabrinė gervė and KINFO awards.

After her success, she became a face of the “Body Talk” women's clothing collection in May 2015.

In 2016, Diržiūtė starred in Kings' Shift directed by Ignas Miškinis and the short film Back directed by Gabrielė Urbonaitė. Both films premiered at the Vilnius International Film Festival. She plays the role of Simona in an independent short, Sexy to the Point, produced by students from Lithuanian Academy of Music and Theatre.

2017–present: International career
After the success in Diržiūtė's home country Lithuania, actress started to work in foreign productions. In 2017 Diržiūtė starred in Russian biographical drama Kharms about an early Soviet-era surrealist and absurdist poet Daniil Kharms. Diržiūtė portrayed poet's second wife Marina Malich. The movie had its premiere in 20th Shanghai International Film Festival, winning two awards for Best screenplay and Best cinematography.

In 2018 Diržiūtė starred in Latvian-British historical fiction film The Pagan King, directed by Latvian director Aigars Grauba.

In 2018 Diržiūtė played Joana in a film Ashes in the Snow, based on the best-selling book Between Shades of Gray by Ruta Sepetys. It follows the Stalinist repressions of the mid-20th century and follows the life of young girl Lina as she is deported from her native Lithuania with her mother and younger brother, and the journey they take to a labor camp in Siberia.

Diržiūtė appeared with actor Rom Blanco in Men in Black: International as a couple at Eiffel Tower.

Personal life

Sidabrinė Gervė 2018 speech
Before presenting an award for best actor in Sidabrinė Gervė 2018 awards, Diržiūtė made a speech about the current situation in the film industry in Lithuania and around the world. During the speech, actress mentioned her The Summer of Sangailė co-star Julija Steponaitytė and Paulė Bocullaitė and thanked for their bravery to speak out against sexual harassment.

Filmography

Awards and nominations

References

1991 births
Living people
21st-century Lithuanian actresses
Lithuanian film actresses
Lithuanian stage actresses
People from Vilkaviškis